The Active Change Foundation is a community project based in Walthamstow in east London with a stated aim to "prevent the spread of violent street crime, gang related issues, community tensions & violent extremism in all its forms.  The group are known for starting the #notinmyname campaign (from September 2014) that voiced protest at the actions of the Islamic State of Iraq and the Levant and the group's misrepresentation of Islam.

Awards and nominations
In January 2015, Active Change Foundation was nominated for the Spirit of Britain award at the British Muslim Awards.

References

London Borough of Waltham Forest